Harold "Phil" Philip Stern (May 3, 1922 – April 3, 1977) was an American art historian and curator. A scholar of Japanese art, Stern was the Director of the Freer Gallery of Art of the Smithsonian Institution from 1971 to 1977.

Career
Stern received all three of his degrees from the University of Michigan: a Bachelor of Arts in Political Science in 1943, a Master of Arts in Art History in 1948, and a Doctor of Philosophy in Art History in 1959.

In 1950, Stern began working at the Freer Gallery of Art of the Smithsonian Institution. He was appointed as Assistant Director in 1962, and was promoted to Director in 1971. He remained in that position until his death. Stern died in 1977 at MedStar Georgetown University Hospital.

See also
List of University of Michigan arts alumni

References

External links
New York Times obituary
Smithsonian Institution obituary

1922 births
1977 deaths
American art curators
American art historians
American Japanologists
University of Michigan alumni
Directors of museums in the United States